Juan Olmo Menacho (born 5 March 1978 in El Cuervo de Sevilla) is a Spanish former cyclist. His brother Antonio is also a cyclist. He rode in the 2007 Vuelta a España.

Major results
2005
1st Stage 5 Tour de Normandie

References

External links

1978 births
Living people
Spanish male cyclists
People from Bajo Guadalquivir
Sportspeople from the Province of Seville
Cyclists from Andalusia